John Tracey may refer to:
John Tracey, American football player
John Plank Tracey, American congressman
John Tracey (warden) (1722–1793), warden of All Souls College, Oxford 1766–1793

See also
John Tracy (disambiguation)
John Treacy, Irish Olympic medallist